Wolchulsan (월출산) is a mountain located in South Jeolla province, South Korea, and spans both Gangjin and Yeongam counties.  At its peak, Cheonhwangbong, it rises to 808.7 meters, making it the highest point in Gangjin County.

It lies in a national park of the same name. A notable feature of the mountain is the "Cloud Bridge" (구름다리) a small suspension bridge that spans two peaks.

External links
 Wolchulsan National Park

References
http://english.knps.or.kr/Knp/Wolchulsan/Intro/Introduction.aspx

Mountains of South Korea
Mountains of South Jeolla Province
Gangjin County
Yeongam County